The canton of Malemort (before March 2020: Malemort-sur-Corrèze) is an administrative division of the Corrèze department, south-central France. Its borders were modified at the French canton reorganisation which came into effect in March 2015. Its seat is in Malemort.

It consists of the following communes:
Dampniat
Malemort
Ussac
Varetz

References

Cantons of Corrèze